
Gmina Powidz is a rural gmina (administrative district) in Słupca County, Greater Poland Voivodeship, in west-central Poland.

Villages
Gmina Powidz contains the villages and settlements of Anastazewo, Charbin, Ługi, Ostrowo, Polanowo, Powidz, Powidz-Osiedle, Przybrodzin, Smolniki Powidzkie and Wylatkowo.

Neighbouring gminas
Gmina Powidz is bordered by the gminas of Kleczew, Orchowo, Ostrowite, Słupca, Strzałkowo and Witkowo.

References
Polish official population figures 2006

Powidz
Słupca County